Area codes 615 and 629 are area codes in Tennessee serving Nashville (Davidson County) and the 12 surrounding counties.  615 is the main area code, while 629 is an overlay covering the same area that began service in 2014. Murfreesboro, Franklin, Brentwood, Gallatin, Hendersonville, and Lebanon are other major cities in the 615/629 service territory.

History
When area codes were introduced in October 1947, Tennessee's only area code was 901. During 1954, in a flash-cut, most of the state east of the Tennessee River's western bend was assigned 615, while 901 was restricted to Memphis and the western third of the state.  This configuration remained in place for over 41 years.

In September 1995, most of the eastern portion of 615—including Chattanooga, Knoxville, and the Tri-Cities—was assigned area code 423. The dividing line between 615 and 423 mostly tracked along the boundary between the Eastern and Central Time Zones; generally, Tennessee's share of the Eastern Time Zone transferred to 423. As a result, the state's three area codes were roughly coextensive with the traditional Grand Divisions of Tennessee; 423 served almost all of East Tennessee, 615 served nearly all of Middle Tennessee, and 901 served nearly all of West Tennessee.

Although this was intended to be a long-term solution, within a year 615 was nearing exhaustion due to the rapid growth of the Nashville area, as well as the proliferation of cell phones and pagers. This forced yet another split in September 1997; the 615 area was reduced to its current size, while most of the western, southern, and eastern portions of the old 615 territory—including Clarksville, Cookeville, Columbia, and Tullahoma—was split off as area code 931, which now almost entirely surrounds 615.  This made 615 largely coextensive with the inner ring of the Nashville metropolitan area.

In 1999, the North American Numbering Plan Administrator (NANPA) informed the Tennessee Regulatory Authority (TRA) that the available telephone numbers in the 615 area code would be exhausted by the fourth quarter of 2000. The TRA and telecommunications providers implemented several number conservation measures that succeeded in averting the predicted crisis. In 2003 the NANPA notified the TRA that the area code was not projected to exhaust its supply of numbers for at least five years. As of March 2012 it was estimated that it would exhaust in the second quarter of 2015, by which time an additional split or an overlay might be necessary. An overlay of 615—which would be Tennessee's first overlay—was recommended. The decision to implement the new area code as an overlay, rather than a split, was made to spare Nashville-area residents and businesses the expense and burden of having to change their numbers, which would have required en masse reprogramming of cell phones.

The overlay code, 629, was approved on October 21, 2013. Permissive dialing began on July 26, 2014, during which it was possible to make calls with either seven or ten digits (the latter with the area code). Ten-digit dialing has been required in the 615/629 area since late February 2015; forgetting to add 615 or 629 first results in a recorded message reminding them.  Nashville was one of the largest cities where seven-digit dialing was still possible.

See also
 List of NANP area codes

References

External links

1954 establishments in Tennessee
2014 establishments in Tennessee
615
615
Telecommunications-related introductions in 1954